The Culebra Ferry, or Lancha de Culebra, also referred to by locals simply as La Lancha, is a ferry service that links the cities of Culebra and Fajardo, Puerto Rico. It is used by Culebra locals and tourists, both for work and vacation-related trips.

History
On January 1, 2000, the Puerto Rican Government passed ownership of all legal passenger ship services to the Puerto Rico Maritime Transport Authority. This was made mostly to enhance service between Culebra, Fajardo and Vieques.

See also
Catano Ferry
Vieques Ferry

External links

CulebraFerry.com Private online ticket agency (not affiliated with ATM)

Boats
Transportation in Puerto Rico